Chandler Catanzaro (born February 26, 1991) is a former American football placekicker. He was signed by the Arizona Cardinals as an undrafted free agent in 2014 and later played for the Tampa Bay Buccaneers, New York Jets, and Carolina Panthers. He played college football at Clemson.

Early years
Catanzaro attended and played high school football at Christ Church Episcopal School. He considered two colleges: Furman University and Clemson University.

College career
Catanzaro attended Clemson University from 2009–2013. After a freshman year, in which he only made 14 of 22 field goals, he finished with a field goal percentage of 81.7%, missing only one kick in each of his junior and senior years. Catanzaro was the all-time leading scorer in Clemson history with 404 points until Travis Etienne broke the record in 2020.

Collegiate statistics

Professional career

Arizona Cardinals

In May 2014, the Arizona Cardinals signed the undrafted Catanzaro to compete along with veterans Jay Feely and Danny Hrapmann. On August 25, 2014, Feely was cut, giving the kicking job to Catanzaro.

Catanzaro made his NFL debut on September 8, 2014, against the San Diego Chargers, kicking two field goals.

On September 14, 2014, Catanzaro kicked four field goals against the New York Giants. He became first Cardinals rookie kicker since Bill Gramatica (December 2, 2001, against the Oakland Raiders) with four field goals in a game.

On September 21, 2014, Catanzaro kicked a season/career-long 51-yard field goal against the San Francisco 49ers, which represents the longest field goal by a rookie in Arizona Cardinals history.

On October 26, 2014, he made his 16th consecutive field goal from the start of his career without a miss, setting an NFL rookie record.

On November 9, 2014, he extended the streak to 17, but missed his second attempt. This effort tied Kai Forbath for the record for most consecutive field goals to start a career.

Catanzaro made 29 field goals in the 2014 season, which is the fourth-most in a single season in Arizona Cardinals history, behind Greg Davis (30), Jay Feely (30), and Neil Rackers (40).

At the end of the 2014 season, Catanzaro established a new franchise rookie record with 114 points, shattering the previous mark of 73 set by placekicker Bill Gramatica in 2001. Catanzaro's 114 points ranked as the second-highest total among NFL rookies behind only the Philadelphia Eagles’ Cody Parkey (150).

On October 4, 2015, Catanzaro kicked a career-high five field goals against the St. Louis Rams.

On September 25, 2016, Catanzaro kicked a career-long 60-yard field goal against the Buffalo Bills in Buffalo. At the time, it was only the 16th field goal of at least 60 yards in the history of the NFL.

On October 23, 2016, Catanzaro missed the game-winning field goal in overtime against the Seattle Seahawks. The game eventually ended in a 6-6 tie.

New York Jets
On March 10, 2017, Catanzaro signed with the New York Jets.

On September 10, 2017, in the season opening 21–12 loss to the Buffalo Bills, Catanzaro converted a 48-yard field goal and a 52-yard field goal in his Jets debut.

On October 1, 2017, in Week 4, the Jets were playing at home against the Jacksonville Jaguars. The game went into overtime with a score of 20–20. Catanzaro had missed a 45-yard field goal earlier in the game. With only 32 seconds left in overtime, he drilled a 41-yard field goal to win the game.

On October 8, 2017 in Week 5, Catanzaro kicked a 57-yard field goal, the longest in Jets franchise history.

Tampa Bay Buccaneers
On March 16, 2018, Catanzaro signed a three-year contract with the Tampa Bay Buccaneers. In the season opener against the New Orleans Saints, he tied his career-high with six extra points converted. On October 21, 2018, in a Week 7 matchup against the Cleveland Browns, after having missed an extra point attempt and a 40-yard field goal attempt earlier in the game Catanzaro hit a game winning 59-yard field goal in overtime to end the game 26-23, in the process setting the record for the longest field goal made in overtime in NFL history. On November 12, 2018, Catanzaro was released by the Buccaneers after missing two field goals in a 16-3 loss to the Washington Redskins. He finished his time with the Buccaneers 11-for-15 on field goals and 23-for-27 on extra points in nine games.

Carolina Panthers
On December 7, 2018, Catanzaro signed with the Carolina Panthers following an injury to Graham Gano.

New York Jets (second stint)
On March 15, 2019, Catanzaro signed with the New York Jets. After announcing his retirement on August 11, 2019, he was placed on the exempt/left squad list on August 11 and then placed on the reserve/left squad list on August 17. He was released from the reserve/left squad list on July 23, 2020.

New York Giants
Catanzaro signed with the New York Giants on August 1, 2020. He was released on August 17, 2020.

NFL career statistics

References

External links
Arizona Cardinals bio
ESPN player profile

1991 births
Living people
American football placekickers
Arizona Cardinals players
Carolina Panthers players
Clemson Tigers football players
New York Giants players
New York Jets players
People from Simpsonville, South Carolina
Players of American football from South Carolina
Tampa Bay Buccaneers players